Hungars may refer to:

 Hungars Church, a historic Episcopal church in Bridgetown, Northampton County, Virginia, US
 Hungars Point, Virginia, an unincorporated community in Northampton County, Virginia, US